Genetic memory may refer to:

Genetic memory (psychology), a memory present at birth that exists in the absence of sensory experience
Genetic memory (computer science), an artificial neural network combination of genetic algorithm and the mathematical model of sparse distributed memory

ar:ذاكرة وراثية
es:Memoria genética
pl:Pamięć genetyczna